Andrea Tripicchio (born 10 January 1996) is an Italian professional footballer who plays as a forward. He plays for  club Grosseto.

Club career

Crotone 
Born in Cosenza, Tripicchio finished his graduation in Crotone's youth system, and made his first-team debut on 24 August 2013, coming on as a late substitute in a 2–5 loss at Siena. On 17 January 2014 he signed a professional deal, running until 2017.

Loan to Reggina 
On 11 August 2016, Tripicchio was signed by Serie C side Reggina on a season-long loan deal. On 20 November, Tripicchio made his Serie C debut for Reggina in a 2–2 home draw against Taranto, he scored his first professional goal in the 48th minute and he was replaced by Fabio Oggiano in the 86th minute. On 27 November he played his first entire match for Reggina, a 1–1 away draw against Catanzaro. On 7 May 2017 he scored his second goal, as a substitute, in the 86th minute of a 4–3 home win over Paganese. Tripicchio ended his loan to Reggiana with 11 appearances, 2 goals and 1 assist.

Loan to Casertana 
On 20 July 2017, Tripicchio was loaned to Serie C club Casertana on a season-long loan. On 30 July he made his debut for Casertana in a 2–0 away defeat against Matera in the first round of Coppa Italia, he played the entire match. On 26 August, Tripicchio made his Serie C debut for Casertana as a substitute replacing Ivan Rajcic in the 74th minute of a 2–1 away defeat against Catanzaro. Tripicchio ended his season-long loan to Casertana with 15 appearances, 14 as a substitute.

Cittanovese 
On 12 August 2019, Tripicchi joined to Serie D club Cittanovese on a free-transfer.

Career statistics

Club

References

External links

1996 births
Living people
Sportspeople from Cosenza
Footballers from Calabria
Italian footballers
Association football forwards
F.C. Crotone players
Reggina 1914 players
Casertana F.C. players
U.S. Castrovillari Calcio players
F.C. Grosseto S.S.D. players
Serie B players
Serie C players
Serie D players